State Road 597 (NM 597) is a  state highway located entirely on the Navajo Nation in San Juan County, New Mexico, United States. The highway serves to link U.S. Route 160 (US 160) to the Four Corners Monument.

Route description 
NM 597 begins at a T-intersection with US 160 in extreme northwestern San Juan County. Traveling northwesterly, the two-lane highway passes through desert terrain to its northern terminus at a toll booth. After passing the toll booth, the road becomes 4 Corners Road, that leads up to Four Corners Monument.

Major intersections

See also

List of New Mexico State Roads shorter than one mile

References

External links

597
Transportation in San Juan County, New Mexico